The Wayne State University College of Engineering is the engineering college of Wayne State University, a public research university in Detroit, Michigan. With more than 29,000 alumni, it is one of the largest engineering colleges in Michigan. Founded in 1933, the College of Engineering has grown to include a variety of programs ranging from civil engineering, biomedical engineering and many others. It is located on Wayne State's main campus in Detroit in a building shared with the Danto Engineering Development Center. The current dean of engineering is Ali Abolmaali.

History
The Wayne State  University College of Engineering had its unofficial beginning in 1920, when co-founder Ernest Drake began teaching the first engineering courses that were a part of the university's chemistry program. Professors Arthur R. Carr and Drake officially founded the college in 1933 and began with only four disciplines: chemical, electrical, mechanical and civil engineering. The classes and the offices were in the Old Main building and several old houses within the neighborhood. By 1937, the college grew to 632 full-time students, with 24 faculty members. To date the College of Engineering has expanded to comprise 135 full-time faculty and 3,493 undergraduate and graduate students.

Academics
The college offers the bachelor of science, master of science, and doctorate of philosophy degrees in many engineering disciplines. It also offers graduate certificates and other non-degree programs.

In fall 2020, the College of Engineering enrolled 3,368 students, including 2,408 full-time students and 960 part-time students. This comprised 2,561 undergraduate students and 807 graduate students. In 2019-20, the college awarded 895 degrees and certificates.

References

College of Engineering
Engineering universities and colleges in Michigan
Engineering schools and colleges in the United States
Universities and colleges in Detroit
Educational institutions established in 1933
1933 establishments in Michigan